Flamingo Road is a 1949 American film noir drama directed by Michael Curtiz and starring Joan Crawford, Zachary Scott, Sydney Greenstreet and David Brian. The screenplay by Robert Wilder was based on a 1946 play written by Wilder and his wife, Sally, which was based on Robert Wilder's 1942 novel of the same name.

The plot follows an ex-carnival dancer who marries a local businessman to seek revenge on a corrupt political boss who had her railroaded into prison. Some of the more salacious aspects of the novel were downplayed in the film because of the Hollywood Production Code.

Robert Wilder, who died in 1974, was later credited as the creator of the American TV series Flamingo Road (1980-1982), which drew elements from both the novel and the film.

Plot
Lane Bellamy is a carnival dancer stranded in the small town of Boldon City in the Southern United States. She becomes romantically involved with Fielding Carlisle, a deputy sheriff whose career is controlled by Sheriff Titus Semple, a corrupt political boss who runs the town. Semple dislikes Bellamy and mounts a campaign against her. She has difficulty finding work and is arrested on a trumped-up morality charge. Meanwhile, Carlisle is the political machine's choice for state senator, and to portray the perfect political family, he marries his long-time girlfriend, Annabelle Weldon.

Sad that the love of her life has divorced himself from her, Bellamy finds work as a hostess at a roadhouse run by Lute Mae Sanders. There, she meets Dan Reynolds, a businessman who supports the corrupt Semple so long as it is profitable. She charms Reynolds into marrying her and the couple moves to the town's best neighborhood, Flamingo Road.

As a kingmaker in the state, Semple decides to run Carlisle for governor and unseat the incumbent. This is too much even for Reynolds and now he decides to oppose Semple. When Carlisle, who has a weakness for alcohol, also begins to show his limits in cooperating with Semple, Semple flies into a rage and abandons him, destroying Carlisle's career. Then Semple makes himself the candidate. At this, Reynolds grows stronger in his opposition, so Semple arranges to have Reynolds framed.

Later, a drunken Carlisle, who knows what's happening but feels the situation is hopeless, visits the mansion on Flamingo Road and commits suicide practically in front of Bellamy. This gives Semple another weapon in his bid to ruin Bellamy and her husband, who has now been indicted for graft. Bellamy confronts Semple with a gun and demands he phone the attorney general and confess everything, but a physical struggle ensues and she shoots him dead. At the end, Bellamy is in prison awaiting a ruling and Reynolds indicates he will stick by her.

Cast
 Joan Crawford as Lane Bellamy
 Zachary Scott as Fielding Carlisle
 Sydney Greenstreet as Sheriff Titus Semple
 Gladys George as Lute Mae Sanders
 David Brian as Dan Reynolds
 Virginia Huston as Annabelle Weldon
 Fred Clark as Dr. Waterson
 Gertrude Michael as Millie
 Tito Vuolo as Pete Ladas
 Alice White as Gracie
 Sam McDaniel as Boatright

Reception and box office
Howard Barnes wrote in the New York Herald Tribune, "Joan Crawford acquits herself ably in an utterly nonsensical and undefined part...It's no fault of hers she cannot handle the complicated romances and double crosses in which she is involved."  Bosley Crowther of The New York Times called it a "jumbled melodrama" in which Crawford robotically experiences a series of crises.  Variety described it as "a class vehicle for Joan Crawford, loaded with heartbreak, romance and stinging violence."

According to Warner Bros. records, the film earned $2,263,000 in the U.S. and $633,000 in other markets.

Home media
The film was released on VHS by Warner Home Video in 1998, which also issued it on DVD in 2008 as part of "The Joan Crawford Collection: Volume 2".

References

External links
 
 
 
 
 

1949 films
1949 drama films
American drama films
American black-and-white films
Film noir
Warner Bros. films
Films adapted into television shows
American films based on plays
Films based on American novels
Films directed by Michael Curtiz
Films scored by Max Steiner
Films based on adaptations
1940s English-language films
1940s American films